The 27th Annual American Music Awards were held on January 17, 2000, at the Shrine Auditorium, in Los Angeles, California. The awards recognized the most popular artists and albums from the year 1999.

Performances

Winners and nominees

References
 http://www.rockonthenet.com/archive/2000/amas.htm

2000
2000 music awards